Ella Park is a neighbourhood in the central part of Täby Municipality, north of Stockholm.

It is dominated by single-family houses built mainly during the period between 1960 and 1970.

References

Populated places in Täby Municipality
Metropolitan Stockholm